Podvirne is a village in Dnistrovskyi Raion, Chernivtsi Oblast, Ukraine. It belongs to Mamalyha rural hromada, one of the hromadas of Ukraine.

Until 18 July 2020, Podvirne belonged to Novoselytsia Raion. The raion was abolished in July 2020 as part of the administrative reform of Ukraine, which reduced the number of raions of Chernivtsi Oblast to three. The area of Novoselytsia Raion was split between Chernivtsi Raion and Dnistrovskyi Raions, with Podvirne being transferred to Dnistrovskyi Raion.

Notable people
 Borys Buryak — painter

References
 

Villages in Dnistrovskyi Raion
Khotinsky Uyezd